Marek Ostrowski (22 November 1959, in Skrwilno – 6 March 2017, in Stockerau, Austria) was a Polish footballer (defender) playing for Poland national football team in 1986 FIFA World Cup.

Club career
He is one of the most notable players of Pogoń Szczecin during his era in the club, as he played 222 games for the club, scoring 30 goals.

International career
Ostrowski made his debut for Poland in a January 1981 friendly match against Japan and earned a total of 37 caps, scoring 1 goal. His final international was an October 1987 friendly match against Czechoslovakia.

International goals
Scores and results list Poland's goal tally first.

Personal life and death
He was hospitalized in January 2017 after a heart attack. He died in his sleep in March 2017, a few days after being discharged by the hospital.

References

External links
 
 
 

1959 births
2017 deaths
People from Rypin County
Sportspeople from Kuyavian-Pomeranian Voivodeship
Polish footballers
Poland international footballers
1986 FIFA World Cup players
Wisła Płock players
Zawisza Bydgoszcz players
Pogoń Szczecin players
FC Admira Wacker Mödling players
SV Stockerau players
Ekstraklasa players
Polish expatriate footballers
Expatriate footballers in Austria
Association football defenders